The Eyes of Darkness is a thriller novel by American writer Dean Koontz, released in 1981. The book focused on a mother who sets out on a quest to find out if her son indeed die one year ago, or if he's still alive.

Plot
A year after her son Danny dies in an alleged accident on a camping trip, stage producer Tina Evans starts receiving paranormal signals insinuating that the boy is still alive. Having never seen Danny's deceased body, she plans to exhume his corpse to put her mind to rest. Assisting Tina is a newly acquainted lawyer Elliot Stryker, formerly working for Army Intelligence, with whom she is having an affair. They are soon targeted by assassins hired by Project Pandora and barely escape alive. Tina, strongly convinced that Danny is still alive, sets out to discover what really happened to her son and rescue him. Elliot accompanies her and the pair are chased by other agents instructed to kill them. Tina is telepathically guided by Danny to an underground lab in Sierra Nevada where her son has been subjected to horrific experiments by a top secret governmental organisation.

Characters
 Christina (Tina) Evans – Danny's mother
 Michael Evans – Danny's father and Tina's ex-husband
 Elliot Stryker – Tina's partner and love interest
 Danny Evans – Tina and Michael's son
 Harold Kennebeck – judge
 Carlton Dombey – scientist for Project Pandora
 Aaron Zachariah – scientist for Project Pandora
 George Alexander – boss of Project Pandora
 Jack Morgan – pilot
 Vivienne Neddler – Tina's house maid
 Willis Bruckster – assassin hired by Project Pandora
 Bob – assassin hired by Project Pandora
 Vince – assassin hired by Project Pandora

Planned television adaptation
According to author Dean Koontz in the afterword of a 2008 paperback reissue, television producer Lee Rich purchased the rights for the book along with The Face of Fear, Darkfall, and a fourth unnamed novel for a television series based on Koontz's work. The Eyes of Darkness was assigned to Ann Powell and Rose Schacht, co-writers of Drug Wars: The Camarena Story, but they could never deliver an acceptable script. Ultimately, The Face of Fear is the only book of the four made into a television movie.

COVID-19 speculation

The novel mentions a bioweapon that in earlier editions is named Gorki-400 after the Soviet city of Gorki in which it was created. Due to the end of the Cold War, the origin of the bioweapon was changed to the Chinese city of Wuhan and it was renamed Wuhan-400 for the 1989 edition onward, prompting speculation from some in early 2020 that Koontz had somehow predicted coronavirus disease 2019 (COVID-19).

References

External links

1981 American novels
1981 science fiction novels
American horror novels
American science fiction novels
American thriller novels
Biological weapons in popular culture
Novels by Dean Koontz
Novels set in Nevada
Works published under a pseudonym